Aidar Kabimollayev (born 26 January 1983) is a Kazakh judoka.
He finished in joint fifth place in the lightweight (73 kg) division at the 2006 Asian Games, having lost to Shokir Muminov of Uzbekistan in the bronze medal match.

He currently resides in Semei.

External links
2006 Asian Games profile

1983 births
Living people
Kazakhstani male judoka
Judoka at the 2006 Asian Games
Asian Games competitors for Kazakhstan
21st-century Kazakhstani people